Seán Twomey (born 2000) is an Irish hurler who plays for Cork Premier Intermediate Championship club Courcey Rovers and at inter-county level with the Cork senior hurling team. He usually lines out as a left wing-forward.

Playing career

Courcey Rovers

Twomey joined the Courcey Rovers club at a young age and played in all grades at juvenile and underage levels. On 10 October 2015, he lined out at left wing-forward when Courcey Rovers suffered a 1-14 to 2-10 defeat by Ahan Gaels in the Minor A Championship final.

On 22 April 2018, Twomey made his first appearance for the club's top adult team in the Premier Intermediate Championship. He scored a hat-trick of goals in the 3-18 to 0-19 defeat of Inniscarra. On 21 October 2018, Twomey scored two points from left corner-forward when Courcey Rovers drew 0-12 to 1-09 with Charleville in the final. He was switched to right wing-forward for the replay a week later but ended on the losing side after a 0-15 to 0-14 defeat.

Cork

Under-17 and under-20

Twomey first lined out for Cork as a member of the under-17 team during the 2017 Munster Championship. He made his first appearance for the team at midfield on 11 April in a 0-16 to 0-06 defeat of Limerick. On 25 April 2017, Twomey won a Munster Championship medal after a 3-13 to 1-12 defeat of Waterford in the final. He was again at midfield for Cork's 1-19 to 1-17 All-Ireland final defeat of Dublin at Croke Park on 6 August 2017.

On 3 July 2019, Twomey made his first appearance for Cork's inaugural under-20 team in the Munster Championship. He came on as a 39th-minute substitute for Simon Kennefick in the 1-20 to 0-16 defeat of Limerick. On 23 July 2019, Twomey top-scored for Cork with 1-02 from left wing-forward in a 3-15 to 2-17 defeat by Tipperary in the Munster final. He was selected at right wing-forward when Cork faced Tipperary for a second time in the All-Ireland final on 24 August 2019, however, he ended the game on the losing side after a 5-17 to 1-18 defeat.

Senior

On 20 December 2019, Twomey made his first appearance for the Cork senior team when he was selected at left wing-forward for Cork's Munster League game against Kerry. He scored four points from play in the 1-27 to 0-11 victory. Twomey made his first National League appearance on 26 January 2020 when he was introduced as a 60th-minute substitute for Conor Lehane in a 1-24 to 3-17 first round defeat by Waterford.

Career statistics

Club

Inter-county

Honours

University of Limerick
Fitzgibbon Cup: 2022, 2023

Cork
All-Ireland Under-20 Hurling Championship: 2020
Munster Under-20 Hurling Championship: 2020
All-Ireland Under-17 Hurling Championship: 2017
Munster Under-17 Hurling Championship: 2017

References

2000 births
Living people
Courcey Rovers hurlers
Cork inter-county hurlers